"La Vie Bohème" is a song from the 1996 musical Rent. It is a celebration of bohemianism, especially the type present in 1980s Alphabet City, Manhattan, which begins with a mocking of the character Benny's statement that "Bohemia is dead". The song features the characters of Rent listing ideas, people, trends, and other symbols of bohemianism and shouting out what and who inspires them, such as jazz poet Langston Hughes and counterculture-era comedian Lenny Bruce. 

The song is broken into two parts, labeled "La Vie Bohème A" and "La Vie Bohème B"; between the two halves of the song is an interlude ("I Should Tell You") featuring a romantic duet between the characters Roger and Mimi, during which they each learn that the other is HIV+ and tentatively decide to begin a relationship together. In the stage musical, the second part of the song opens with a brief dialogue between the characters Maureen and Joanne discussing a protest instigated by Maureen earlier in the play, before the cast continues the celebration of bohemianism.

References

1996 songs
Idina Menzel songs
List songs
Song recordings produced by Arif Mardin
Songs from Rent (musical)
Songs written by Jonathan Larson
Bohemianism